Maud Medenou (born 5 October 1990 in Évry, Essonne) is a French basketball player who plays for club Toulouse Métropole Basket of the Ligue Féminine de Basketball the top league of basketball of women in France.

References

French women's basketball players
1990 births
Living people